The Ministry of Mines and Energy is the national executive ministry of the Government of Colombia that oversees the regulation of the mining and mineral industry and the electricity sector in Colombia, it is similar in its duties to other energy ministries of other countries.

List of Ministers

References

 
Ministries established in 1974
Colombia
Colombia
Mining in Colombia
Energy in Colombia